Ixtapa-Zihuatanejo International Airport  is an international airport in the state of Guerrero on Mexico's Pacific Ocean coast. It receives thousands of tourists all year to visit beaches and resorts. It handles national and international air traffic for the cities of Ixtapa and Zihuatanejo.

It handled 317,395 passengers in 2020, and 434,176 passengers in 2021.

Architecture 
The architect of the 1998 new Ixtapa International Airport, its renovation, expansion and extended facilities, was Mexican architect and great-grandson of Queen Isabella II of Spain, Manuel De Santiago-de Borbón González Bravo. He was a member of ICOMOS (International Council on Monuments and Sites, UNESCO), and his lifetime architectural legacy to Mexico adds to 11,000,000 built square meters nationwide, including famous buildings and national sites, as well as important national restorations like the Mexican Houses of Congress Palace, Palacio Legislativo de San Lázaro.

Airlines and destinations

Statistics

Passengers

Busiest Routes

Gallery

See also

List of the busiest airports in Mexico

References

External links
 Grupo Aeroportuario Centro Norte de México
 Airlines in Ixtapa Zihuatanejo :: Visitixtapazihuatanejo.com 
 Ixtapa-Zihuatanejo Tourist Guide
 ixtapa-zihuatanejo.com Tourist guide for Ixtapa & Zihuatanejo. What to do, where to go and much, much more. Official website of Zihuatanejo Hotels Assoc.

Airports in Guerrero
Buildings and structures in Guerrero